Anno is a real-time strategy, economic simulation video game series, conceived in 1998 by Max Design. The series focuses on players establishing colonies on a series of small islands, conducting exploration of the region, diplomacy and trade with other civilisations and traders, while managing resources and engaging in combat both on land and sea. Most games in the series take place during Renaissance and Empire-building historical periods of Earth's history, with cultures, architecture and customs based upon real-life elements from these periods, though in-game civilisations tend to be neutral from exact nations.

Each game in the series is mainly a stand-alone title, featuring the same level of reoccurring gameplay mechanics, though with each installment amending existing gameplay mechanics and adding new features, with expansions packs adding in further content. Initial games mainly focused on two modes of gameplay, with players able to operate in single-player or multiplayer over LAN or online connections, while later titles added in a campaign mode of several missions, each featuring their own unique storyline - plots usually focus on players becoming involved in a major incident while beginning life as the ruler of a small island.

While primarily developed for PC, the series has also included a variety of spin-off titles mainly for handheld consoles, which in turn feature more simplified game mechanics to those of the main series. Each title over the series' history has featured a variety of different developers and publishers, with the most recent entries being currently developed by Blue Byte and published by Ubisoft. Most entries in the series have received average reviews from critics. The first title, Anno 1602, was Germany's best-selling computer game of all time as of December 2002, with sales of 2.5 million copies worldwide and 1.7 million in the German market. Its sequel broke its sales-speed record, becoming Germany's fastest full-price computer game to reach 500,000 domestic sales. It ultimately sold over one million units in German-speaking countries, and, when combined with its predecessor, reached 4.5 million sales worldwide by October 2006.

Titles

Main series

Spin-offs 
Anno 1701: Dawn of Discovery (2007)
A video game for the Nintendo DS, and spin-off of the series.
Anno: Create A New World (2009)
A video game for the Nintendo DS and the Wii, known in North America as Dawn of Discovery.
Anno Online (2013–2018)
A free-to-play browser game (shut down in January 2018).
Anno: Build an Empire (2015)
For Android and iOS platforms.
Anno 2205: Asteroid Miner (2015)
For Android and iOS platforms.

See also 
 The Settlers, a similar German real-time strategy and business simulation game
 Unknown Horizons, a game inspired by the Anno series
 The Patrician, a similar German game series focused on ships and trade, but also featuring Anno-like strategy elements

References

External links 
 Anno Ubisoft website (US)
 Anno Union, Anno development blog
 Anno at MobyGames

 
Video games developed in Germany
Ubisoft franchises
Video game franchises introduced in 1998